The 2008 Volta de Ciclismo Internacional do Estado de São Paulo (Portuguese for International Cycling Tour of the State of São Paulo) is the 5th edition of a multi-day road cycling stage race held in the state of São Paulo. This edition features 9 stages over 1048 km, disputed from April 20 to 27, 2008. The race is a 2.2 event in the 2007–2008 UCI America Tour.

Classification and Bonuses 
In this edition of the race, time bonuses of 10, 6 and 4 seconds are awarded to the top 3 riders in each stage. Time bonuses of 3, 2 and 1 seconds are awarded to the first 3 riders at each intermediary sprint point. For the points classification, the top 5 riders in each stage are awarded 10, 7, 5, 3 and 2 points, respectively. The first 3 riders at each intermediary sprint receive 5, 3 and 2 points. Climbs are classified among 4 categories. The first 3 riders at each summit are awarded points in the mountains classification according to the category:

 Category 1: 11, 9, 8 pts
 Category 2: 9, 7, 6 pts
 Category 3: 7, 5, 4 pts
 Category 4: 5, 3, 2 pts

The team classification accounts the times of the first 3 riders of each team in each stage.

Stages and Results

Stage 1: São Paulo 

Held Sunday, April 20, 2008, in Autódromo José Carlos Pace. This stage featured 20 laps in the racing circuit, for a total distance of 85.84 km. A field of 94 riders finished with the same time of the stage winner, Edgardo Simón.

Stage 2: Sorocaba to São Carlos 

Held Monday, April 21, 2008. This stage was 230.2 km long. A field of 76 riders finished with the same time of the stage winner, Edgardo Simón.

Stage 3: São Carlos time trial 

Held Tuesday, April 22, 2008. This stage was an 11.3 km individual time trial along the streets of São Carlos.

Stage 4: São Carlos to Ribeirão Preto 

Held Tuesday, April 22, 2008. This stage was 93.2 km long, and was held in the afternoon, a few hours after Stage 3. A field of 95 riders finished with the same time of the stage winner, Edgardo Simón.

Stage 5: Cajuru to Campinas 

Held Wednesday, April 23, 2008. This stage was 199.0 km long. A group of 8 riders finished with the same time of the stage winner, Otávio Bulgarelli.

Stage 6: Campinas to Atibaia 

Held Thursday, April 24, 2008. This stage was 193.0 km long.

Stage 7: Atibaia to São José dos Campos 

Held Friday, April 25, 2008. This stage was 105.6 km long, and a field of 102 riders finished with the same time
of the stage winner, Francisco Chamorro.

Stage 8: São José dos Campos to Campos do Jordão 

Held Saturday, April 26, 2008. This mountain stage was 79 km long.

Stage 9: Jundiaí to São Paulo 

Held Sunday, April 27, 2008. This stage was 51.5 km long.

Final Results

Participating teams and riders

 UCI Continental teams

  SCF – Scott–Marcondes Cesar–São José dos Campos
 10 –  Magno Prado Nazaret
 11 –  Pedro Autran Nicácio
 12 –  Breno Sidoti
 13 –  Maurício Morandi
 14 –  Fabrício Morandi
 15 –  Renato Seabra
 16 –  Alex Diniz
 17 –  Edgardo Simón

 National teams

  Uruguay – Uruguay National Team
 190 –  Richard Mascaraña
 191 –  Jorge Bravo
 192 –  Alvaro Tardáguila
 193 –  Gonzalo Tagliabue
 194 –  Cristian Villanueva
 195 –  José Miraglia
 196 –  Geovane Fernández
 197 –  Fredy Peralta

 Regional teams

  ACME – ACME Cycling Team
 140 –  Maurício Frazer
 141 –  Javier Lindner
 142 –  Jesus Patalagoytia
 143 –  Lisandro Ajcu
 144 –  Adolfo Trabochi
 145 –  Luis Marroquin
 146 –  Gabriel Epstein

  Avaí-Florianópolis – Avaí/Florianópolis/APGF
 80 –  Jair Santos
 81 –  Marcelo Moser
 82 –  Ramiro Gonzales
 83 –  Rafael Gerhard
 84 –  Rafael Silva
 85 –  Edson Resende
 86 –  Gustavo Zorzo
 87 –  Flávio Reblin

  CESC-Sundown – CESC/Sundown/Nossa Caixa/Calipso/Maxxis
 30 –  Luiz Amorim Tavares
 31 –  Rogério Silva
 32 –  Walter Ribeiro Jr.
 33 –  Francisco Chamorro
 34 –  Raul Cançado
 35 –  Edson Corradi
 36 –  Elivelton Pedro
 37 –  Diego Portugal

  Chivilcoy-Argentina – Ciudad de Chivilcoy
 180 –  Emilio Martin
 181 –  Fernando Antogna
 182 –  Gustavo Toledo
 183 –  Armando Borrajo
 184 –  César Sigura
 185 –  Pedro Prieto

  Dataro – Clube Dataro de Ciclismo/Blumenau
 40 –  Alcides Vieira
 41 –  Cleberson Weber
 42 –  Gregolry Panizo
 43 –  Jocielmo Marins
 44 –  Renato Santos
 45 –  Eduardo Pereira
 46 –  Carlos França
 47 –  Sidnei Silva

  DET-Cordeirópolis – DET Cordeirópolis/Kuruma/Incefra/Unilance
 110 –  Andrio Lima
 111 –  Fábio Ribeiro
 112 –  Hernandes Cuadri
 113 –  Marcelo Soares
 114 –  Elinton Stocco
 115 –  Leonardo Lima
 116 –  Glauber Nascimento
 117 –  André Souza

  Gob.Zulia – Venezuela/Gob.Zulia/Alcadia de Cabimas
 170 –  Manuel Medina
 171 –  Víctor Moreno
 172 –  Adelso Valero
 173 –  Franklin Chacón
 174 –  José Contreras
 175 –  Hebert Rivas

  Juarez-México – Municipalidad de Juarez – México
 150 –  Fidel Goytia
 151 –  Jessiel Valenzuela
 152 –  Ricardo Tapia
 153 –  Javier Pérez
 154 –  Marco Arriagada
 155 –  Ismael Ponce

  Memorial-Santos – Memorial/PM Santos/Giant/Nossa Caixa
 1 –  Marcos Novello
 2 –  Antônio Nascimento
 3 –  André Pulini
 4 –  Thiago Nardin
 5 –  Eduardo Pinheiro
 6 –  Robson Dias
 7 –  Patrick Oyakaua
 8 –  Armando Camargo

  Metodista-SBC – Metodista/São Bernardo do Campo/Sundown/Nossa Caixa
 70 –  Adriano Martins
 71 –  Alexandre Mantovani
 72 –  Jerre Souza
 73 –  Jeovane Oliveira
 74 –  Wilian Rodrigues
 75 –  Marcelo Simeoni
 76 –  Jean Coloca
 77 –  João Paulo Vieira

  Sales-BH – Sales Supermercados/Pinarello/BH
 20 –  Miguel Direnna
 21 –  Márcio Pinto
 22 –  Roger Ferraro
 23 –  Valcemar Justino
 24 –  Vanderlei Melchior
 25 –  Renato Rohsler
 26 –  Fabiele Mota
 27 –  Gilberto Goes

  Sel.Paulista – Seleção Paulista
 130 –  Jean Silva
 131 –  Gideoni Monteiro
 132 –  Valmir Baia
 133 –  José Cláudio Santos
 134 –  Carlos Santos
 135 –  Alberto Camera

  SF-Kenda – São Francisco/Kenda/Nossa Caixa/DKS/Ribeirão Preto
 60 –  Michel García
 61 –  Murilo Costa
 62 –  Rodrigo Melo
 63 –  Anderson Echeverria
 64 –  Humberto Vale
 65 –  Juliano Silva
 66 –  José Jailson Diniz
 67 –  Daniel Amaral

  SLS-Americana – São Lucas Saúde/UCA/Americana
 120 –  Anderson Oliveira
 121 –  Bruno Pereira
 122 –  Bruno Tabanez
 123 –  Geraldo Santos
 124 –  José Júnior Diniz
 125 –  Luciano Silva

  Suzano-Flying Horse – Suzano/Flying Horse/Caloi
 90 –  Alex Arseno
 91 –  Douglas Bueno
 92 –  Kléber Ramos
 93 –  Léo Ferréira
 94 –  Otávio Bulgarelli
 95 –  Patrique Azevedo
 96 –  Renato Ruiz
 97 –  Tiago Fiorilli

  Team Vale – Team Vale/FAPI/O Lojão/Gramado/JKS/Sejelp
 100 –  Ezequiel Riderson
 101 –  Flávio Cardoso
 102 –  Raphael Serpa
 103 –  Roberto Pinheiro
 104 –  Fabiano Mota
 105 –  Fábio Fagundes
 106 –  Fernando Tomaz
 107 –  Marcos Pereira Jr.

  União-Assis – União/Assis-Amea
 50 –  Alan Maniezzo
 51 –  Justino Ribeiro
 52 –  Diego Domingues
 53 –  José Medeiros
 54 –  Ruy Sá Neto
 55 –  Josias Silva
 56 –  Elton Marroni
 57 –  Rodrigo Cheles

References 
 Stage 1 Results
 Stage 2 Results
 Stage 3 Results
 Stage 4 Results
 Stage 5 Results
 Stage 6 Results
 Stage 7 Results
 Stage 8 Results
 Stage 9 Results

Volta de Ciclismo Internacional do Estado de São Paulo
Volta de Ciclismo Internacional do Estado de São Paulo
Volta de Ciclismo Internacional do Estado de São Paulo
April 2008 sports events in South America